The Dehcho Region or Deh Cho is one of five administrative regions in the Northwest Territories of Canada. According to Municipal and Community Affairs the region consists of six communities with the regional office situated in Fort Simpson. All communities in the Dehcho are predominantly Dehcho First Nations.

Communities
The Dehcho Region includes the following communities:

References

External links

Deh Cho Region at Municipal and Community Affairs